The University of Hawaiʻi Board of Publications (BOP) was created in 1966, officially separating it from the Associated Students of the University of Hawaiʻi (ASUH). The BOP publishes student publications. BOP sponsored publications are meant to foremost provide students with opportunities as participants as well as readership, as well as provide the university community with journalistic as well as literary services, in order to promote the reputation of the university as well as student publication programs.

The BOP also provides fiscal and management oversight to provide support to and promote the student press.

The BOP relies on revolving fund resources, which are derived from a student publications fee, plus additional revenue generated by advertising.

The BOP currently publishes the campus newspaper, Ka Leo O Hawaii, and a campus literary journal, Hawaii Review.

The BOP is part of the Department of Co-curricular Activities, Programs, and Services (CAPS).

References

Organizations established in 1966
University of Hawaiʻi
Organizations based in Hawaii
Hawaii Board Of Publications